Frank Carpenter Mockler (April 4, 1909 – November 16, 1993) was an American attorney who served as the governor of American Samoa. Mockler was the county attorney for Fremont County, Wyoming. He was Speaker of the Wyoming House of Representatives in 1951 as a Republican. He was Secretary of American Samoa under John Morse Haydon. Mockler took the office of Governor of American Samoa on October 15, 1974, and ended his term on February 6, 1975. After leaving the governor's seat, Mockler moved to Longboat Key, Florida.

References

External links 
 Frank C. Mockler at politicalgraveyard.com

Governors of American Samoa
People from Fremont County, Wyoming
Speakers of the Wyoming House of Representatives
People from Longboat Key, Florida
1909 births
1993 deaths
Republican Party members of the Wyoming House of Representatives
American Samoa Republicans
Florida Republicans
20th-century American politicians